Trevor Gordon Martin (17 November 1929 – 5 October 2017) was a British stage and film actor known for playing popular British characters.

Early life and education
Martin's parents were from Dundee; he was raised in Enfield, and after military service trained at the Guildhall School of Music and Drama, where he won the Carleton Hobbs Radio Award in 1953, as a result of which he began his career with the BBC Radio Drama Company.

Career

Theatre
Martin was perhaps best known for playing the Doctor on stage at the Adelphi Theatre, London in Doctor Who and the Daleks in the Seven Keys to Doomsday based on the popular television series Doctor Who. In the 1974 play he essayed the role of an alternate Fourth Doctor, a role he reprised in a 2008 audio adaptation of the play from Big Finish Productions.

Television and film
Previously Martin appeared in Doctor Who as a Time Lord in the 1969 serial The War Games opposite Second Doctor Patrick Troughton and later guested in the 1993 Doctor Who radio play The Paradise of Death alongside Third Doctor Jon Pertwee and the 2003 Doctor Who audio drama Flip-Flop alongside Seventh Doctor Sylvester McCoy.

Television credits are many ranging from the 1960s onwards and include Sherlock Holmes, Jackanory, Van der Valk, Z-Cars, Special Branch, The Onedin Line, Coronation Street, Inspector Morse and The Bill. He also appeared as Mr Giddings in an episode of Call the Midwife.

Films include Othello (1965), Absolution (1978), Krull (1983), The House of Mirth (2000), and Babel (2006).

Personal life and death
Martin was married twice. He first married Janet Moreton, they later divorced. He then married Scottish actress Hermione Gregory. He had four children from his first marriage; his son Sandy Martin has been an MP. He died on 5 October 2017 at the age of 87, while on holiday in Bulgaria.

References

External links

An interview with Trevor Martin from Sonic Screwdriver magazine

1929 births
2017 deaths
20th-century British male actors
21st-century British male actors
British male stage actors
British male television actors
British male film actors
Alumni of the Guildhall School of Music and Drama
Male actors from Edinburgh